Marit Elisabeth Larsen (born 1 July 1983) is a Norwegian singer and songwriter. She began playing violin at age of 5 and played it until the age of 8. She gained international fame during her teenage years as a member of the pop duo M2M with childhood friend Marion Raven. She then pursued her own music career, releasing her debut solo album Under the Surface in 2006. Her second album, The Chase, was released in Norway in October 2008. Her third album, titled Spark was released in Norway, Denmark, Sweden and Finland on 18 November 2011, and in Germany, Austria and Switzerland on 16 December 2011. Her fourth studio album When the Morning Comes was released on 20 October 2014. Larsen toured in its support within Norway with her own concerts, played songs from the album in Germany and Switzerland at public festivals and was the opening act at two of Johannes Oerding's concerts in November 2015.

Career

M2M and early solo career

Marit Larsen was born in Lørenskog, Norway. She became friends with Marion Raven at age five, and they formed their own band when they were eight, naming it "Hubba Bubba" after their favourite bubblegum. They released a children's album, Synger Kjente Barnesanger, under the band name "Marit & Marion". The album was nominated for a Spellemannprisen award when they were both 12 years old. They later decided to shorten the band name to M2M. Atlantic records signed them to a worldwide contract in 1998. Their debut single, Don't Say You Love Me, was both a critical and commercial success. The song was part of their debut album, Shades of Purple. Despite critical acclaim, their second album, The Big Room, did not perform as well commercially, and the duo broke up the year of its release.

After the breakup of M2M, Raven began her solo career, while Larsen took time off to go to school. Fan interest was reignited in 2004 and early 2005 when Larsen made several appearances in Norway, showing off a darker-haired image and new music with increased instrumental and lyrical scope. Larsen performed three original songs, titled "This Time Tomorrow", "Recent Illusion", and "Walls", on NRK radio in October 2004, showcasing her skills at both guitar and piano. She also performed live at the highly anticipated by:Larm concert in February 2005.

2005–2007: Under the Surface
Larsen recorded her debut album in fall 2005, Under the Surface, with her new record label, EMI. The first single, "Don't Save Me", made radio impact on 3 January 2006, and quickly climbed into the top ten on many Norwegian charts and playlists. After the physical single release on 6 February 2006, "Don't Save Me" jumped to No. 1 on the official Norwegian singles chart in its second week of availability, and then spent five consecutive weeks in the top spot. The second single released from the album was the title track "Under the Surface". Both the single and its accompanying video were released in Norway in May 2006 and within a month the single became the most widely played track on Norwegian radio. After debuting at No. 19 the single peaked at No. 6 and spent 16 weeks inside the Norwegian Top 20. "Only A Fool" and "Solid Ground" were the third and fourth singles released, respectively. Her father Geir Tore Larsen played cello on the album, and her then-boyfriend, the musician Thom Hell, was one of the musicians on it.

Under the Surface, which was released in Norway on 6 March 2006, contains 11 songs, most of which were written solely by Larsen. Touted as "what many people consider to be the most eagerly awaited album of 2006" (according to Norwegian magazine, Plan B), the record debuted and peaked at No. 3 on the sales chart in Norway. On 31 March 2006, after just three weeks of sales, Under the Surface became a certified gold record in Norway, selling over 20,000 copies. In late 2006 and early 2007, "Under the Surface" won Larsen other accolades, including the award for Best Norwegian Act at the MTV Europe Music Awards, and the Spellemannprisen (Norwegian Grammy) awards for Best Female Artist and Best Video ("Don't Save Me"). After Larsen's Spellemannprisen victories in January 2007, the album crossed the 40,000 copy mark, qualifying it for platinum certification. It was later announced in May 2007 that the album had reached double platinum status. In addition, she was the most played artist on NRK P3 radio in 2006, with her three singles ("Don't Save Me", "Under the Surface", and "Only A Fool") being played collectively more than 880 times.

Concurrently with the release of "Under the Surface", Larsen participated in the "Lyd i mørket" charity concert series in early March 2006. She began a Norwegian club tour in late April, headlining concerts for the first time in her career. She then played in music festivals across Norway during the summer, and held a second Norwegian club tour starting in October 2006.

"Under the Surface" was released in India and Thailand in late 2006, and in November, "Don't Save Me" began to be played on MTV Asia. Larsen also began making international appearances, performing at special events in Germany and Spain in September 2006, India in October 2006, and France in January 2007. She appeared in the United States at South by Southwest in March 2007. On 2 May 2007, Right Bank Music announced that Larsen would be managed by them for a possible release in the U.S.

2008–2010: The Chase and "If a Song Could Get Me You"

Larsen's second solo album, The Chase, was released in Norway on 13 October 2008 and in Sweden on 19 November 2008. Like "Under the Surface", it was well received by critics; in December, it was named as the top album of the year by Dagbladet reviewers.

The first single from The Chase, titled "If A Song Could Get Me You", shot to No. 1 on the Norwegian singles chart in its first week of sales in August 2008, and was later nominated for the Spellemannprisen award as Hit of the Year. The second single was "I've Heard Your Love Songs" (released 27 October 2008), and another song from the album, "Steal My Heart", was used in the soundtrack of the Norwegian movie "I et speil, i en gåte" ('‘Through a glass, darkly'’).

Early 2009, Larsen joined Jason Mraz as an opening act for his European spring tour. She was invited by Mraz when they met each other during the Nobel Peace Prize concert in 2008.

Larsen released "If A Song Could Get Me You" as her first single outside Norway. It was released in Germany, Austria, Switzerland and Iceland. In Germany and Austria it became a number-one single. In Switzerland it peaked at No. 2. The song also peaked at No. 19 in Iceland.

In November 2009, Larsen started her first German-Swiss Tour.

On 24 November, Verdens Gang, a Norwegian newspaper made a list of the best Norwegian songs of the past decade 2000–2009. "Under the Surface" was judged as the best song of the decade, making her 1st place on the list. Her song "If A Song Could Get Me You" came in 4th place and her album "Under the Surface" gets 2nd place for the best album of the decade.

Marit recorded a duet with Belgian singer-songwriter Milow titled "Out of My Hands". The song was originally contained in Milow's album "Coming of Age" released in 2008 in Belgium. The duet version featuring Marit was released on 12 February 2010 via Milow's MySpace page and Marit's YouTube page.

In July 2010, Marit Larsen released the remake single of "Don't Save Me".

2011–2013: Spark
January 2011 Larsen recorded the song "Vår Beste Dag" (Our Best Day) in her native language for the NRK. Released only in Norway, it reached No. 1.

On 1 August, Marit Larsen started to record her 3rd solo album at Propeller Recordings.

On 7 October Marit Larsen announced that the album will be called Spark including 10 new tracks. The album was released in Norway, Sweden, Finland, and Denmark on 18 November. In Germany, Switzerland and Austria the album was released on 16 December. The first single, "Coming Home" had premiered on NRK P1 and on her Facebook page on 15 October. The music video had premiered on Verdens Gang's website on 12 November.

On 24 October 2011, "Coming Home" was frequently played on the radio in the Philippines and was named the "Most Wanted Song Of The Month." The song topped the charts in the Philippines for 4 consecutive weeks and gave Marit her first number 1 song as a solo artist in the Philippine Top 100 Songs. A previous song, "The Day You Went Away" (2000) with M2M (band) was number 1 in the Philippines for 9 non-consecutive weeks. On 16 December "Coming Home" was performed by Marit Larsen on the finals of Idol Norge while Marion Raven was one of the judges on the same show. On 9 January 2012, despite not being released as a single, "Last Night" received moderate radio airplay success in the Philippines and stayed on top of the hcarts for 2 consecutive weeks and gave Marit her second number 1 song in the Philippine Top 100 Songs. It also reached number 3 in Thailand.

2014–present: When the Morning Comes and Joni was Right
On 14 July 2014, Marit premiered her single "I Don't Want to Talk About It" from the album When the Morning Comes on NRK P3 radio. The single was released on 4 August 2014. The album, which climbed to No. 1 in Norway, was released in the Nordic countries on 20 October 2014. In Germany, Switzerland and Austria it was released on 27 March 2015. In the USA When the Morning Comes was released through iTunes on 29 January 2016.

Between 14 January and 14 February 2015, Marit Larsen played nineteen concerts on her "When The Morning Comes Tour" in Norway. On 18 January 2016, despite not being released as an official single, "Before You Fell" received commercial radio airplay success in the Philippines which helped the song to stay on top of the charts for 6 consecutive weeks and gave Marit her third number 1 song in the Philippine Top 100 Songs. the song was named as the "February Conqueror" by various DJs for staying at number 1 for the whole month.
 
In January 2016 Marit Larsen announced that she will release new material in April 2016. She also announced that she will release her new material on her own, independent label (Håndbryggrecords), and will continue to release music independently in the future. The EP, entitled Joni was Right, was released on 1 April 2016. It contains five tracks and is available on iTunes and other online music stores. On 9 September 2016 the EP Joni was Right II, which contains five tracks, was released on iTunes and other online music stores. On 9 September 2016 Marit Larsen also released a CD and a vinyl record called Joni was Right I / II, where the ten tracks of the two EP releases were combined. The CD release of Joni was Right I / II entered the Norwegian album charts at No. 36 on 16 September 2016.

Personal life 
Larsen dated Isaac Hanson for two years when the two met during M2M's tour with his band, Hanson in 2000.

Larsen married former international handball player, Alexander Buchmann in 2016 and they share a daughter named Astrid Ira.

Discography

Studio albums

Compilation albums

Extended plays

Singles

Features

Covers and unofficial releases

Music videos

Awards and nominations

References

External links

Marit Larsen – Official Website

1983 births
Living people
Norwegian pop singers
Norwegian singer-songwriters
People from Lørenskog
Spellemannprisen winners
Norwegian multi-instrumentalists
Folk-pop singers
English-language singers from Norway
21st-century Norwegian singers
21st-century Norwegian women singers
MTV Europe Music Award winners